Bushbuckridge (also known as Mapulaneng) is the main town in Bushbuckridge Local Municipality, Ehlanzeni District, Mpumalanga, South Africa. It grew around a trading store that opened in 1884, and is named after the large herds of bushbuck found here in the 1880s, and the prominent ridge in the southeastern part of the municipality.

The suburbs and rural areas to the south of Bushbuckridge constitute a "sub place", called Bushbuckridge NU with a 2011 population of 1070, covering .

Notable people
Frank Chikane (1951), civil servant, writer and cleric
Themba Godi - politician, former member of the Parliament of South Africa
Ronald Lamola - Minister of Justice and Correctional Services
Letago Madiba - South Africa women's national football team player
Jeff Maluleke - musician
Sasekani Manzini - Mpumalanga MEC for Health
Katlego Mashego - member South Africa national football team 
Mzilikazi wa Afrika - investigative journalist
Hungani Ndlovu - actor
Brighton Ngoma - actor
David Nyathi - former South Africa national football team player, coach
Sam Nzima - photographer, who took what became the well known image of Hector Pieterson for the Soweto uprising
Trevor Nyakane - Rugby player for the Bulls and the South Africa national rugby team

Notes and references

Populated places in the Bushbuckridge Local Municipality
Populated places established in 1884
1884 establishments in the South African Republic